Niccolò Tofanari (born 12 May 1998) is an Italian footballer who plays as a defender for  club Rimini.

Club career
He made his Serie C debut for Pontedera on 27 August 2017 in a game against Alessandria.

On 7 August 2019, he signed with Ascoli and was immediately loaned to Fano.

Upon his return from loan, he made his Serie B debut for Ascoli on 30 December 2020 in a game against Empoli.

On 22 January 2021, he joined Serie C club Ancona-Matelica.

On 6 August 2022, Tofanari joined Rimini on a two-year contract.

References

External links
 
 

1998 births
Living people
Footballers from Florence
Italian footballers
Association football defenders
Serie B players
Serie C players
A.S. Roma players
U.S. Città di Pontedera players
A.S. Gubbio 1910 players
Ascoli Calcio 1898 F.C. players
Alma Juventus Fano 1906 players
Ancona-Matelica players
Rimini F.C. 1912 players
Italy youth international footballers